Yannick Cahuzac (born 18 January 1985) is a French former professional footballer and who is current assistant manager of Ligue 1 club Lens who played as a defensive midfielder. In his career, he played for Bastia, Toulouse, and Lens.

He is the grandson of international footballer and coach Pierre Cahuzac.

Career
In July 2017, Cahuzac joined Toulouse from Bastia on a fee transfer, agreeing to a two-year contract.

In May 2019, it was reported that Cahuzac would be moving to Lens in the summer having agreed a two-year contract. Due to his Toulouse contract running out he would sign on a free transfer.

On 10 May 2022, Cahuzac announced his retirement at the end of the 2021–22 season.

Career statistics

Honours
Bastia
 Ligue 2: 2011–12
 Championnat National: 2010–11
 Coupe de la Ligue runner-up: 2014–15

References

External links
 
 
 

1985 births
Living people
Sportspeople from Ajaccio
French footballers
Footballers from Corsica
Association football midfielders
Corsica international footballers
Gazélec Ajaccio players
SC Bastia players
Toulouse FC players
RC Lens players 
Ligue 1 players
Ligue 2 players
Championnat National players
Championnat National 3 players